Alabat may refer to the following:

 Alabat Island, island in the province of Quezon in the Philippines
 Alabat, Quezon, municipality on the island
 Inagta Alabat language, nearly extinct language on the island